The River Bollin is a major tributary of the River Mersey in the north-west of England.

It rises in Macclesfield Forest at the western end of the Peak District, and can be seen in spring form, from the Buxton to Macclesfield road. The stream then descends the  through Macclesfield and The Carrs Park in Wilmslow where it has a confluence with the River Dean, near to Styal Prison.  For the following  it defines the southwestern portion of the border between Greater Manchester and Cheshire before merging with the River Mersey north of Lymm. It flows through the Styal country park and was used in the cotton calico factory there, Quarry Bank Mill, as a source of power. Near to the Quarry Bank Mill site there is a natural weir.  The Bollin is culverted underneath the southern runway of Manchester Airport.

The town of Macclesfield used to dispose all its waste and sewage into the Bollin. The profusion of human sewage in the Bollin was still common in 1850.

Tributaries

 Agden Brook (L)
 Millington Clough
 Birkin Brook (L)
 Blackburn's Brook (L)
 Shawgreen Brook (L)
Rostherne Brook
 Mopperley Brook (R)
 Mobberley Brook
 Swim Brook (R)
 Whim Brook (R)
 Whitehall Brook (R)
 Pott Brook (R)
 Sugar Brook (R)
 Tatton Mere brook (L)
 Pedley Brook (R)
 Marthall Brook

Rivers of Cheshire
Rivers of Greater Manchester
Rivers of Trafford
1Bollin